Guta District is a district of the city of Jinzhou, Liaoning, People's Republic of China.

Administrative Divisions
There are nine subdistricts within the district.

Subdistricts:
Tian'an Subdistrict, Shiyou Subdistrict, Beijie Subdistrict, Bao'an Subdistrict, Raoyang Subdistrict, Nanjie Subdistrict, Zhanqian Subdistrict, Jingye Subdistrict, Shiying Subdistrict

References

External links

County-level divisions of Liaoning
Jinzhou